John Harding (25 May 1932 – 12 October 1994) was  a former Australian rules footballer who played with Fitzroy in the Victorian Football League (VFL).

Notes

External links 		
		
		
		
		
		
		

1932 births		
1994 deaths		
Australian rules footballers from New South Wales		
Fitzroy Football Club players
East Sydney Australian Football Club players